Our Children Are Dying is a book-length extended portrait of Elliott Shapiro, the experimental principal of P.S. 119 in Harlem, New York, written by Nat Hentoff and published by Viking Press in 1966.

References

External links 

 

1966 non-fiction books
American non-fiction books
English-language books
Books about education
Education in New York City
Viking Press books